Kevin Faller (1920–1983) was an Irish scriptwriter and poet.

Faller was born in Galway City. His paternal grandparents were German refugees from the Black Forest in Baden-Wuerttemberg, and had opened a jewellery shop in 1879 on Williamsgate Street, in the city centre.

He moved to Dublin in 1945, working with book publishers, on newspaper editorial staff and wrote radio scripts.

Select bibliography

 Genesis (a novel), London, TV Boardman, 1953
 Lyrics, Dublin, Colm O’Lochlainn, 1963
 Lament for Bull Island and Other Poems, Dublin, The Goldsmith Press, 1973
  The Lilac Tree and Other Poems, Dublin, St Beuno's Press, 1979
 Memoirs: Collected Poems, Mornington, County Meath, Tracks, 1984
 Irish Poetry of Faith and Doubt:The Cold Heaven, ed. John F. Deane, Wolfhound Press, 1990.

References

 Galway Authors, Helen Mahar, 1976
 http://www.ricorso.net/rx/az-data/index.htm Ricorso
 https://web.archive.org/web/20091004191229/http://www.irishwriters-online.com/kevinfaller.html

People from County Galway
1983 deaths
1920 births
Irish people of German descent
20th-century Irish poets
20th-century male writers